Parakənd may refer to:
 Parakənd, Gadabay, Azerbaijan
 Parakənd, Lankaran, Azerbaijan